The University of Alabama School of Law, (formerly known as the Hugh F. Culverhouse Jr. School of Law at The University of Alabama) located in Tuscaloosa, Alabama is a nationally ranked top-tier law school and the only public law school in the state. It is one of five law schools in the state, and one of three that are ABA accredited. According to Alabama's official 2017 ABA-required disclosures, 84% of the Class of 2017 obtained full-time, long-term, JD-required employment nine months after graduation. An additional 8.4% of the Class of 2017 obtained JD-advantage employment.

Approximately 383 JD students attended Alabama Law during school year 2018–2019. 62 undergraduate institutions and 25 states are represented among the class of 2021, and the student-faculty ratio is 6.3 to 1.

Academics
Alabama Law offers the Juris Doctor (J.D.) degree, as well as an International LL.M., an LL.M. in Taxation, and an LL.M. in Business Transactions. In conjunction with the Manderson Graduate School of Business, the law school also offers a four-year joint J.D./M.B.A. program. Students may also pursue a number of graduate degrees through established dual enrollment programs for M.A. or Ph.D. in Political Science, M.P.A., Ph.D. in Economics, or LL.M. in Taxation. Certificates in Public Interest Law, Governmental Affairs, and International and Comparative Law are also available.

Admissions have been increasingly selective. The class of 2021 has a median LSAT score of 164 and median undergraduate GPA of 3.88. The 75th and 25th percentile for these metrics are 165 and 3.95, and 157 and 3.42, respectively.

Law clinics
Alabama Law guarantees that every interested student has the opportunity to participate in at least one law clinic before graduating. It is one of the few law schools in the country to make this guarantee.
 The Children's Rights Clinic works with the Alabama Disabilities Advocacy Program to assist youth with disabilities in the juvenile justice system.
 The Civil Law Clinic is Alabama's oldest clinic and provides free legal advice and representation to University of Alabama students and community members in civil matters. Civil clinic students handle over 200 cases annually.
 The Criminal Defense Clinic represents indigent defendants in misdemeanor and felony criminal matters for both bench and jury trials.
 The Domestic Violence Clinic takes a holistic approach to assisting survivors of domestic abuse in Tuscaloosa County, Alabama. In addition to providing comprehensive legal services, clinic students also perform outreach and education.
The Entrepreneur & Nonprofit Clinic provides free transactional legal services to small businesses, start-ups, and nonprofit organizations. The suite of services include preparation of formation documents, agreement negotiation and drafting, and regulatory compliance.
 The Mediation Law Clinic provides an alternative to the adversarial litigation process for families to settle disputes more promptly and with a reduction in emotional trauma.

Publications
In 2007 Jarvis & Coleman ranked the Alabama Law Review (ALR) 36th "on the basis of the prominence of their lead article authors." This represents an incredible 63 position improvement from the rankings of ten years prior. For 2015–2016, ExpressO, UC Berkeley's manuscript submission service, ranked the ALR at 10th in terms of "number of manuscripts received." In 2015 Washington and Lee's methods rank ALR at 46th in both the number of citations from other journals and the combined score. These show an improvement of 10 and 26 positions, respectively, over the preceding 5 years.
 Alabama Civil Rights & Civil Liberties Law Review
 Alabama Law Review
 Journal of the Legal Profession
 Law & Psychology Review

Approximately 40% of students graduate with journal experience.  This is a slightly lower percentage than many of Alabama's peer schools, but nonetheless above the national average.

Employment 
According to Alabama's official 2017 ABA-required disclosures, 83.2% of the Class of 2016 obtained full-time, long-term, bar passage required employment within nine months after graduation. Alabama's Law School Transparency under-employment score for 2017 is 7.6%, indicating the percentage of the Class of 2017 who were unemployed, pursuing an additional degree, or working in a non-professional, short-term, or part-time job nine months after graduation.

Costs
Tuition and fees at the University of Alabama School of Law for the 2018–2019 academic year total $23,920 for residents and $42,180 for nonresidents. 69.2% of students received discounts during the 2017–2018 school year; the remaining 30.8% paid full price. Law School Transparency estimated debt-financed cost of attendance for three years at full price to be $157,785 for residents and $231,042 for nonresidents.

Notable alumni

 Hugo Black, U.S. Senator, Associate Justice of the Supreme Court, (1937–1971)
 Harper Lee, writer, attended the school for several years, but did not complete a degree. (1930–2016) 
 Edward B. Almon, United States Representative from Alabama (1915–1933) 
 James B. Allen, United States Senator from Alabama (1969–1978) 
 Mel Allen, sportscaster best known as the "Voice of the New York Yankees" and first host of This Week in Baseball 
 John W. Abercrombie, United States Congressman from Alabama (1913–1917) and President of the University of Alabama (1902–1911) 
 Spencer Bachus, United States Congressman from Alabama's 6th Congressional District (1993–present) 
 Samuel A. Beatty, Associate Justice of the Alabama Supreme Court (1976–1989)
 Charles J. Cooper (class of 1978), clerk to Chief Justice William Rehnquist, U.S. Supreme Court, founder of law firm, Cooper & Kirk, in Washington, D.C.
 Emmett Ripley Cox, United States Court of Appeals for the Eleventh Circuit, 
 Catherine Crosby, Miss Alabama 2003
 Morris Dees, Southern Poverty Law Center founder
 Paul DeMarco, Alabama Representative
 Mark Everett Fuller (J.D., in 1985), former United States district judge for the United States District Court for the Middle District of Alabama (forced resignation 2015)
 Millard Fuller, founder of Habitat for Humanity
 Victor Gold, journalist, political consultant, and author
 Perry O. Hooper, Sr., 27th chief justice of the Alabama Supreme Court 
 Frank Minis Johnson, United States Court of Appeals for the Eleventh Circuit 
 Maud McLure Kelly, first woman to practice law in Alabama
 Claude R. Kirk, Jr., (Class of 1949) former governor of Florida
 Bert Nettles (Class of 1960), Republican member of the Alabama House of Representatives from 1969 to 1974 from Mobile; lawyer in Birmingham
 Shorty Price, perennial candidate for Governor of Alabama
 Bill Baxley, former Attorney General and Lieutenant Governor of Alabama, and Civil Rights lawyer  
 Jeff Sessions, 84th United States Attorney General and former U.S. Senator from Alabama (1997–2017)  
 Steadman S. Shealy, starting quarterback on Alabama's 1978 and 1979 national championship teams 
 Robert Smith Vance, United States Court of Appeals for the Eleventh Circuit 
 David Vann (class of 1951), law clerk to Justice Hugo Black, U.S. Supreme Court, and mayor of Birmingham, Alabama
 George Wallace, former governor of Alabama
 Roy Moore former Chief Justice, Supreme Court of Alabama; Republican nominee, U.S. Senate Alabama Special Election December 12, 2017. 
 Junius Foy Guin, Jr. (1947), former United States district judge for the United States District Court for the Northern District of Alabama
Nick Wilson, public defender and reality show contestant

References

External links
 

1872 establishments in Alabama
Educational institutions established in 1872
Law
Law schools in Alabama
Edward Durell Stone buildings
Buildings and structures in Tuscaloosa, Alabama